Ulteramus is an extinct genus of parasitic wasp in the sawfly family Pamphiliidae.  The genus is solely known from an Eocene fossil found in North America.  At the time of its description the new genus was composed of a single species, Ulteramus republicensis.

History and classification
Ulteramus republicensis is known only from one fossil, the part side of the holotype, specimen number UWBM 77532, which is housed in the collections of the Burke Museum of Natural History in Seattle, Washington. The specimen is preserved as a compression fossil in silty yellow to grayish shale, which was recovered from outcrops of the Tom Thumb Tuff member of the Klondike Mountain Formation in 1993 by Wesley Wehr. Ulteramus was first studied by the paleoentomologists S. Bruce Archibald from Simon Fraser University in Burnaby, British Columbia and Alexandr Rasnitsyn of the A. A. Borissiak Paleontological Institute. Their 2015 type description of the new genus and species was published in the journal Canadian Entomologist. The genus name Ulteramus was coined by the researchers as a combination of the Latin ramus meaning "branch" and ulter meaning "on the further side". The specific epithet republicensis is a reference to the type locality of the species in Republic, Washington.

Areas of the Ulteramus wing venation are similar to members of the pamphiliid subfamilies Pamphiliinae and Cephalciinae.  The two subfamilies are distinguished from each other on the condition of the wing apex.  Longitudinal corrugation of the wing apex is seen in Pamphiliinae, while Cephalciinae genera have an irregularly coriaceous wing apex.  The described fossil of Ulteramus is missing the majority of the wing apex area, but the small portion that is preserved seems to be smooth.  However the placement of the junction between the Subcostal2 and Radius vein distinguishes Ulteramus from all other pamphiliid genera.  Due to the incomplete nature of the fossil, placement of the genus into any of the three described subfamilies or creation of a new subfamily was not possible.

U. republicensis was one of three sawfly species described in Archibald & Rasnitsyn's 2015 paper, the other two being Ypresiosirex orthosemos and Cuspilongus cachecreekensis, both from the McAbee fossil beds in south central British Columbia.

Description
The single described wing of U. republicensis is incomplete, missing the very basal and apical sections. Additionally the area of the wing between the Radial and Costal veins is either damaged or folded, obscuring vein details. The wing has an even darkened tone to the membrane with a large pterostigma hardened by sclerotisation. The placement of the join between the Sc2 and R veins nearer to the wing base is not seen in other pamphiliids, resembling that of Xyelidae genera. The Radius vein segment 4 is longer than seen in other pamphiliids, and the vein segment 1 is present, though it isn't well preserved, obscuring some of the morphological details. The short segment 1 is something not seen in the genera Caenolyda, Pseudocephaleia, and Kelidoptera.

References

Ypresian insects
Fossils of the United States
Fossil taxa described in 2015
Prehistoric insects of North America
Klondike Mountain Formation